Isabella Ribeiro Santoni (born 6 May 1995) is a Brazilian actress. She became nationally known as Karina, the main role of the 22nd season of Malhação.

Biography 
Isabella Santoni was born in Nilópolis, Rio de Janeiro, to teacher Ana Cristina Ribeiro. She grew up in Nova Iguaçu, in the Baixada Fluminense, until she was 15 years old. When she decided to become an actress, she tried to enroll in a vacation course at the Casa de Artes Laranjeiras in Rio de Janeiro. The minimum age to start the course was 16, but Santoni called the place and convinced them to accept her at 15.

Santoni had to make some sacrifices because of her career, one of them was the request to transfer a private school to a public one, since she could not reconcile work with her studies. Even though the teaching conditions were precarious, Santoni was able to be approved for the Federal University of the State of Rio de Janeiro (UniRio) in 2013, where she majored in theater.

Filmography

Television

Series and Webseries

Film

Videoclip

Stage

Awards and nominations

References

External links

1995 births
Living people
People from Nilópolis
Brazilian people of Italian descent
Brazilian television actresses
Brazilian stage actresses
Brazilian film actresses
Brazilian telenovela actresses